Mark David Colegrave, (born 1 July 1968, at Hobart, Tasmania) is an Australian cricket player, who played for the Tasmanian Tigers in the 2000–01 season. Colegrave is a talented fast bowler who excelled in the Tasmanian Grade Cricket competition, but never managed to properly break into the Tigers team.

Colegrave was also a champion Australian rules footballer who played in the Tasmanian Football League for both the Hobart Tigers from 1988 to 1997 and later the Clarence Football Club from 1998 to 2000, playing in Hobart's 1990 premiership team and finishing his career with a premiership with Clarence in 2000.

See also
 List of Tasmanian representative cricketers

External links
Cricinfo profile

1968 births
Living people
Australian cricketers
Tasmania cricketers
Clarence Football Club players
Hobart Football Club players
Australian rules footballers from Tasmania
Cricketers from Hobart